WorldQuant University (WQU) is a U.S. accredited not-for-profit university. Its programs are entirely-free. As of May 2022, between its two programs, WQU has graduated more than 11,000 students from over 100 countries. It is licensed by the Board of Regents of the State of Louisiana and accredited by the Distance Education Accrediting Commission (DEAC) for its Master’s Degree in Financial Engineering Program. WQU’s Applied Data Science Lab is a credentialed offering where students use data analysis to solve real-world and complex problems.

Overview
WorldQuant University was founded by Igor Tulchinsky in 2015 on the premise that talent is equally distributed but opportunity is not. The University is funded by the WorldQuant Foundation. After being licensed by the Louisiana Board of Regents, the Foundation launched WQU in 2015 enrolling several hundred students in a free, online Master's degree in Quantitative Finance. As its first president, Sarah McCue, PhD, conceptualized and led the launch of WQU's financial engineering Master's Degree.

Daphne Kis, who had served on the University's Advisory Board, was brought on as CEO and Board Director in 2017.

In late 2016, the university was awarded the 2016 Dive Award: Startup of the Year by the publication Education Dive. By June 2017, it had enrolled 700 students from 40 countries. In 2021, WQU was accredited by the Distance Education Accrediting Commission (DEAC). Through WorldQuant, it is a Strategic Partner of the Milken Institute and the World Economic Forum (WEF).

Relationship to WorldQuant 
Igor Tulchinsky, Founder, Chairman, and CEO of WorldQuant, LLC, established the WorldQuant Foundation, which sponsors WorldQuant University.

Advisory board 
WorldQuant University’s Advisory Board is a group of prominent leaders in the finance, business, and education sectors who function as advocates and advisors. Active members provide support regarding educational requirements, professional preparation, and overall workplace development to WQU leadership.

WQU’s Advisory Board meets on a regular basis. Members of the Advisory Board include Linda Ban, Lydiah Kemunto Bosire, Lenore Blum, Marc Carletti, Michael DeAddio, Bruno Dupire, Esther Dyson, Paul Tudor Jones, Ann Kirschner, Alex Lipton, Christopher Mason, Mel Ochoa, David Shrier, Admiral James Stavridis, USN, and Susan Wolford.

Academics 
WorldQuant University currently offers an entirely-free, two-year Master of Science in Financial Engineering (MScFE) degree program and a free, self-paced Applied Data Science Lab. Successful completion of the former results in the student earning an accredited Master's degree; upon completion of the latter, students attain a shareable Credly certification.

Accreditation 
WorldQuant University is accredited in all 50 states by the Distance Education Accrediting Commission (DEAC), a United States Department of Education authorized accreditor. The State Authorization Reciprocity Agreement (NC-SARA) has also approved WQU to offer its online education programs to students in 49 US states, the District of Columbia, and US territories. The University also enrolls students in California under a non-profit exemption. WQU is approved to operate by the Board of Regents of the State of Louisiana

MSc in Financial Engineering 
WorldQuant University's entirely-free, accredited, online MSc in Financial Engineering Program integrates mathematical, statistical, and computer science tools with finance theory and professional business skills. The two-year program consists of nine graduate-level courses and a Capstone course during which students complete a culminating project. Course topics span financial markets, data feeds, and computational finance, among other subjects.

Applied Data Science Lab 
The Applied Data Science Lab is a free, credentialed offering where students use data analysis to solve real-world meaningful, and complex problems.  

During this self-paced course, students complete eight projects that range from exploring housing prices in Mexico to predicting air quality in Kenya. They work with publicly available datasets, upon which they can develop larger portfolio projects. Students receive real-time feedback as well as opportunities to collaborate with their peers and to participate in live office hours with their instructor.

See also

Cooperative learning
Cooperative education
Open educational resources
Online learning

References

External links
WorldQuant University Official Website

Distance education institutions based in the United States
Educational institutions established in 2015
American educational websites
Non-profit organizations based in Louisiana
Open universities
Universities and colleges in New Orleans
Private universities and colleges in Louisiana
Virtual learning environments
2015 establishments in Louisiana